Mount Westall is a mount in Queensland, Australia. It was named on 21 August 1802 by Matthew Flinders. He offered to name the highest visible point in the vicinity after whoever reached the top first. The landscape artist William Westall won, hence the name.

See also

List of mountains in Australia

References

Westall
Central Queensland